Anthony Samuel Levy (born 20 October 1959) is a former footballer who played as a midfielder. He made 14 appearances in the Football League for Plymouth Argyle and Torquay United, and won six caps for New Zealand at full international level.

Levy made his full All Whites debut in a 4–0 win over Chinese Taipei on 11 December 1988  and ended his international playing career with six A-international caps to his credit, his final cap an appearance in a 2–2 draw with Israel on 9 April 1989.

References

External links

1959 births
Living people
Footballers from Edmonton, London
English footballers
New Zealand association footballers
New Zealand international footballers
Association football midfielders
Plymouth Argyle F.C. players
Torquay United F.C. players
Yeovil Town F.C. players
St Albans City F.C. players
Tooting & Mitcham United F.C. players
Carshalton Athletic F.C. players
Hayes F.C. players
English Football League players
Isthmian League players
Expatriate association footballers in New Zealand
University-Mount Wellington players